The La Marmora II government of Italy held office from 28 September 1864 until 31 December 1865, a total of  days, or .

Government parties
The government was composed by the following parties:

Composition

References

Italian governments
1864 establishments in Italy